The Bonga Field is an oilfield in Nigeria. It was located in License block OPL 212 off the Nigerian coast, which was renamed OML 118 in February 2000. The field was discovered in 1996, with government approval for its development given in 2002. The field began first production in November 2005. The field is worked via an FPSO vessel. The field produces both petroleum and natural gas; the petroleum is offloaded to tankers while the gas is piped back to Nigeria where it is exported via an LNG plant. The field contains approximately 6,000 mm barrels of oil.

The field is operated by Shell Nigeria who own 55% of the license. The other partners in the field development are Exxon (20%), Nigerian AGIP (12.5%) and Elf Petroleum Nigeria Limited (12.5%)

Field history

A secondary field was discovered in the block in May 2001 known as Bonga SW, which encountered significant hydrocarbons. A third field was discovered later in 2004 which is known as Bonga North.

Field development

The field has been produced as a subsea tie back to a Floating Production Storage and Offloading vessel (FPSO). Currently there are 16 oil producing and water injection wells on the field. However, this will be increased to nearly 40 wells as the field is developed further.  Due to the large size of the Bonga SW it is currently thought it will require separate production facility to adequately produce the field.

Oil produced from the field is stored on the FPSO for transport to markets via tankers while the gas is exported via a pipeline to the Nigerian Coast for LNG.

The FPSO was built by Samsung Heavy industries. It was then taken to Newcastle upon Tyne for installation of the process topsides. It contained a number of firsts for its type. The SURF (Subsea, Umbilicals, Risers, Flowlines) contract was won by Stolt Offshore (later renamed Acergy and now Subsea7 ). Stolt vessel POLARIS installed all the flowlines and subsea structures in J-Lay and S-Lay pipelay modes.

Production at the well was shut down for three weeks after 19 June 2008, after an attack by the Movement for the Emancipation of the Niger Delta.

2011 oil spill 

On 20 December 2011 an oil spill occurred that "likely was less than 40,000 barrels, or 1.68 million gallons [6.4 megalitres]". It was probably the worst spill in the area for a decade. Oil spills have the potential to cause great damage to the environment, for example water pollution, which reduces fishing yields and agriculture, which is one of Nigeria's largest industries.

See also

 Petroleum industry in Nigeria
 Natural gas
 Oilfield

References

External links
Bonga Deep water Project from Shell Nigeria

Oil fields of Nigeria
Natural gas fields in Nigeria
Shell plc oil and gas fields